Howard Davis (born 24 September 1932) is a British field hockey player. He competed at the 1956 Summer Olympics, the 1960 Summer Olympics and was captain at the 1964 Summer Olympics.

References

External links
 

1932 births
Living people
British male field hockey players
Olympic field hockey players of Great Britain
Field hockey players at the 1956 Summer Olympics
Field hockey players at the 1960 Summer Olympics
Field hockey players at the 1964 Summer Olympics
People from Broseley